Justin David Rowland (born May 10, 1937) is a former American football player who played with the Chicago Bears, Minnesota Vikings, and Denver Broncos. He played college football at Texas Christian University.

References

1937 births
Living people
American football defensive backs
TCU Horned Frogs football players
Chicago Bears players
Minnesota Vikings players
Denver Broncos (AFL) players
Players of American football from Texas
People from Hamlin, Texas